Provincial Road 248 (PR 248) is a provincial road in the province of Manitoba, Canada.  

It runs from PTH 6 southward, crossing the Assiniboine River near PTH 26, where it ends, to the Trans-Canada Highway (PTH 1) at Elie.  The junction of PTH 1 and PR 248 is one of only two signal-controlled intersections on the Trans-Canada Highway between Headingley and Brandon.  From Elie, PR 248 continues southward, intersecting PTH 2 at Fannystelle, and ending at PR 305.

PR 248 is mostly a paved, two-lane road, except for the southernmost portion between PTH 2 and PR 305.

References

External links
Official Manitoba Highway Map

248